In Ohio, State Route 62 may refer to:
U.S. Route 62 in Ohio, the only Ohio highway numbered 62 since about 1932
Ohio State Route 62 (1923), now SR 19

62